Remember is a 2022 South Korean drama film directed by Lee Il-hyung, starring Lee Sung-min and Nam Joo-hyuk. It was released theatrically on October 26, 2022.

Synopsis 
Remember tells the story of Pil-Joo (Lee Sung-min), an Alzheimer's patient in his 80s, who lost all his family during the Japanese colonial era, and devotes his lifelong revenge before his memories disappear, and a young man in his 20s (Nam Joo-hyuk) who helps him.

Cast
 Lee Sung-min as Han Pil-joo
 Nam Joo-hyuk as Park In-gyu
 Jung Man-sik as Kang Young-sik
 Park Geun-hyung as Kim Chi-duk 
 Song Young-chang as Jeong Baek-jin
 Moon Chang-gil as Yang Seong-ik
 Park Byung-ho as Hisashi Tojo

Release 
The film was invited to the 42nd Hawaii International Film Festival. The film's distribution rights were pre-sold to 115 countries, including France, Russia, India, Hong Kong, Vietnam, Malaysia, Taiwan and Singapore, and North America.

References

External links
 
 
 

South Korean historical drama films
2020s Korean-language films
2020s South Korean films